The Systems Research Institute (S.R.I.), Pune was established by Prof. Jaswant Krishnayya, formerly IIM Ahmedabad, in 1974 as a non-profit body in response to the need in India today for places where the problems associated with development can be approached in an integrated multidisciplinary way. It is registered as a Society and as a Public Trust.

The institute has pioneered Informatics, Decision Making using computer models and GIS in India.

Notable alumni
Notable Alumni of SRI include N. R. Narayana Murthy, Anupam Saraph, Anand Deshpande, Air Marshal S. S. Ramdas, Dr. KNS Nair, Girish Sant and Prof. N. Vinod Chandra Menon.

External links
 Official Website of the Systems Research Institute

Non-profit organisations based in India